El Zorro may refer to:
Zorro, a fictional Californio hero
El Zorro (wrestler), Mexican professional wrestler
El Zorro (railway), Australian railway operator
 El Zorro (film), a 1968 Italian film
 Zorro, (1955-2017), Mexican singer and politician

See also
Zorro (disambiguation)